The Khartoum Zoo was a zoological park located in Khartoum, Sudan.

History
The zoo was founded at the center of Khartoum in 1901 to house animals given to "the Governor General as complimentary presents" and those caught for sale to zoos in Europe and other places. In 1903 it was moved to a spot between the White and Blue Niles. In 1995, the zoo was moved again after the grounds were sold to an investor. After the closure of the zoological gardens, the Corinthia Hotel was built on the site.

The Kuku Zoo was established in Hilat Koko, in Khartoum, in 2009 by the Faculty of Veterinary Medicine and Animal Production of the Sudan University of Science and Technology.

Animals
The old Khartoum Zoological Gardens kept animals such as lions, elephants, zebras, hippopotamus, tortoises, and others.

See also
 Addis Ababa Zoo
 Rabat Zoo

References

External links 
 Hampson Collection. No. 10 : In Khartoum Zoo 1929 : [home movie] (1929) (YouTube)
 Khartoum 1952: A day at the zoo (Vimeo)
 Kuku Zoo in Khartoum North

Khartoum
Zoos in Sudan